The Caledonian Railway 670 Class was a class of 0-4-2 steam locomotives designed by  George Brittain for the Caledonian Railway (CR) and introduced in 1878.

Ownership changes
Nine locomotives were withdrawn in 1922, or earlier. Twenty-one survived into the ownership of the London, Midland and Scottish Railway (LMS) in 1923; these were withdrawn between 1923 and 1932.

Numbering

Notes
 † locos with140 psi pressure
 †† locos with 150 psi pressure

References

670
0-4-2 locomotives
Railway locomotives introduced in 1878
Standard gauge steam locomotives of Great Britain